Time lapse may refer to:

 Time-lapse photography, a film technique
 Time-lapse microscopy, a type of microscopy
 Time-lapse phonography, an audio signal processing technique
 Timelapse (video game), a computer game
 Time Lapse (album), an album by British guitarist Steve Hackett
 In a Time Lapse, an album by Italian composer Ludovico Einaudi
 "Time Lapse" (The Twilight Zone), the seventh episode of the television series The Twilight Zone
 Time Lapse (film), a 2014 science-fiction thriller film
 "Time Lapse", a 2015 song made by the German producer TheFatRat
 Timelapse of the Entire Universe, 2018 short film by John Boswell
 Timelapse of the Future, 2019 short film by John Boswell